Gerard Williams may refer to:

Gerard Williams (American football) (born 1952), former American football cornerback
Gerard Williams (footballer) (born 1988), Saint Kitts and Nevis footballer
Gerard Williams (baseball), Negro leagues baseball player

See also
Gerry Williams (disambiguation)
Gerald Williams (disambiguation)